HMS Zanzibar (K596) was a  of the United Kingdom that served during World War II. She was ordered by the United States Navy as the Tacoma-class patrol frigate USS Prowse (PF-92) and was transferred to the Royal Navy prior to completion.

Construction and acquisition
The ship, originally designated a "patrol gunboat," PG-200, was ordered by the United States Maritime Commission under a U.S. Navy contract as USS Prowse. She was reclassified as a "patrol frigate," PF-92, on 15 April 1943 and laid down by the Walsh-Kaiser Company at Providence, Rhode Island, on 20 October 1943. Intended for transfer to the United Kingdom, the ship was renamed Zanzibar by the British prior to her launch on 21 November 1943.

Service history
Transferred to the United Kingdom under Lend-Lease on 21 June 1944, the ship served in the Royal Navy as HMS Zanzibar (K596). She operated out of Derry, Northern Ireland, and Greenock, Scotland, on convoy escort duty into the western Atlantic Ocean as far as Boston, Massachusetts. In addition, she served as a weather ship on Ocean Station No. 19 in both the spring of 1945 and the spring of 1946.

Disposal
The United Kingdom returned Zanzibar to the U.S. Navy on 21 May 1946 at Brooklyn, New York. She was stricken from the U.S. Naval Vessel Register on 29 October 1946 and sold on 17 June 1947 for scrapping.

References

Notes

Bibliography
 
 Navsource Online: Frigate Photo Archive HMS Zanzibar (K 596) ex-Prowse ex-PF-92 ex-PG-200

External links
 navalhistory.flixco.info : HMS Zanzibar
 Photo gallery of USS Prowse

1943 ships
Ships built in Providence, Rhode Island
Tacoma-class frigates
Colony-class frigates
World War II frigates and destroyer escorts of the United States
World War II frigates of the United Kingdom
Weather ships